Martin Field  is a private airport located 4 miles northeast of the central business district (CBD) of Palmer, Alaska, USA.

Airline 
There is no scheduled airline service to this field.

References

External links 

 Resources for this airport:
 
 

Airports in Matanuska-Susitna Borough, Alaska